Assyrians in Jordan include migrants of Assyrian origin residing in Jordan, as well as their descendants. As of June 2019, the Assyrians in Jordan number approximately 10,000-15,000; however, these are mostly transient since they are refugees and most of them came from northern Iraq, one of the four locations of the traditional Assyrian homeland areas which part of what is now northern Iraq, southeastern Turkey, northwestern Iran and, more recently, northeastern Syria. They mostly live within the capital city of Amman.

See also
Iraqis in Jordan

References

Jordan
Assyrian ethnic groups
Middle Eastern diaspora in Jordan